Moncel-sur-Vair (literally Moncel on Vair) is a commune in the Vosges department in Grand Est in northeastern France.

The commune was created in 1965 by the fusion of the former communes of Gouécourt and Moncel-et-Happoncourt.

See also
Communes of the Vosges department

References

Communes of Vosges (department)